Omiros Zagkas (born 18 January 1993) is a Cypriot swimmer. In 2010, he competed at the 2010 Summer Youth Olympics in the boys' 50 metre freestyle. In 2019, he represented Cyprus at the 2019 World Aquatics Championships held in Gwangju, South Korea and he finished in 60th place in the heats in the men's 50 metre freestyle event. In the men's 100 metre freestyle he finished in 79th place in the heats. In the same year, he competed at the 2019 Games of the Small States of Europe held in Budva, Montenegro.

References 

Living people
1993 births
Place of birth missing (living people)
Cypriot male freestyle swimmers
Male breaststroke swimmers
Swimmers at the 2010 Summer Youth Olympics